IEDEA is an agency, headquartered in Dubai, UAE and registered with DMCC at the JLT business district. The company's goal is to facilitate intra-Asia businesses through publishing initiatives, digital forums, events and more.

It was founded by Malini N. Menon.

IEDEA's Asian Business Leadership Forum (ABLF) is a UAE-based leadership event series that is hosted under the patronage of Sheikh Nahayan Mabarak Al Nahayan, UAE Cabinet Member and Minister of Tolerance, and Commissioner General of the Expo 2020 Dubai, and in association with the UAE Ministry of Economy.

IEDEA is also the Official Outreach Partner to a number of UAE Government initiatives such as the World Government Summit, Dubai Investment Week, Global Women's Forum Dubai, and the UAE's National Program for Happiness and Wellbeing (NPHW), among others. Since 2018, IEDEA is also the Strategic Partner of Dubai Cares.

The company owns, co-owns and manages brand, event and publishing IP portfolios, such as the ‘Asian Business Leadership Forum Awards™’, ‘TopicIndia.com’, the ‘Images of Success™’ series and the ‘ICLF Series’, among others.

Projects

Asian Business Leadership Forum (ABLF)
The Asian Business Leadership Forum is an annual leadership event series that celebrates high achievers in Asian business. The Award showcases business leadership across Asia. In its inaugural edition, the ABLF Awards 2011 felicitated 14 business leaders across five categories in the three Asian regions of the Persian Gulf, India and South-East Asia.
The Asian Business Leadership Forum (ABLF) is Asia's most prestigious event, the ultimate get-together of the elite business and policy leadership from the vibrant Gulf–South Asia–South East Asia Corridor.

According to Kamal Nath, Indian Urban Development Minister,“Events like the ABLF Awards are important because they support the opportunity of engagement between the Asian countries. The Persian Gulf, India and South-East Asia are amongst the fastest growing regions in the world and I am sure that this event will engage the best entrepreneurial minds and business talent from the regions.”

Sheikh Ahmed Bin Saeed Al Maktoum, the Chairman and Chief Executive of the Emirates Airline Group said, “I am very glad that the UAE is participating at the Asian Business Leadership Forum Awards, an event that celebrates Asia as a whole.”

Kapil Sibal, Indian Minister for Communication and Information Technology and HRD, noted, “It is time that these exemplary women, who have broken the glass ceiling and re-written business history across Asia and claim their place of pride in global business world, be felicitated at an international event of significance.”

The third edition of the ABLF Awards took place on 14 December 2013, at the Armani Hotel, Burj Khalifa, Dubai. Some of the recipients of the ABLF Awards 2013 included Sheikh Ahmed bin Saeed Al Maktoum, President of the Dubai Civil Aviation Authority, Chairman of Dubai Airports, Chairman of Emirates airline and Chief Executive of the Emirates Group; Sheikh Khalifa bin Salman Al Khalifa, Prime Minister of Bahrain, Chua Sock Koong, Group CEO, Singtel, Singapore, Dr.Prathap C. Reddy, Chairman, Apollo Group of Hospitals and William E. Heinecke, CEO and Chairman of Minor International among others.

During the 2013 award show, ABLF featured an “India-UAE” showcase that felicitated six India-UAE Business Icons responsible for the growing socio-economic ties between the two nations. Some of the India-UAE Business Icons celebrated at the Awards were Abdullah Mohammed Saleh, Governor of the Dubai International Financial Centre; Khalaf Ahmad Al Habtoor, Chairman of the Al Habtoor Group, M. A. Yousuf Ali, Managing Director of the Emke (Lulu) Group; Dr Bavaguthu Raghuram Shetty, CEO and Managing Director of the New Medical Centre (NMC Health) Group of Companies and UAE Exchange.

ABLF Awards also unveiled in 2013 the OneAsia2020 initiative presentation, the inaugural ceremony including a keynote address by the force behind the initiative, Dr.Thaksin Shinawatra, former Prime Minister, Thailand.

The leadership event series marked its 10th anniversary on 22 November 2017 at The Armani Hotel, Burj Khalifa, Dubai. The 10th Anniversary Edition of the ABLF honoured Sheikha Fatima bint Mubarak, Mother of the Nation, Chairwoman of the General Women's Union, Supreme Chairwoman of the Family Development Foundation and President of the Supreme Council for Motherhood and Childhood, a beloved leader of the UAE, a great humanitarian and an advocate for women's empowerment.

On 3 March 2019, the ABLF launched a special edition magazine in partnership with the Gulf News. Dedicated to the Year of Tolerance, the magazine features leaders and stories from across Asia. Prominent leaders featured include Ratan Tata, Chairman, Tata Trusts India; N.R. Narayan Murthy, Founder, Infosys; Gopichand Hinduja, Co-Chairman, Hinduja Group of Companies; Kiran Mazumdar Shaw, Chairperson and Managing Director, Biocon; Dr Preetha Reddy, Vice-Chairperson, Apollo Hospitals Enterprises; Eng. Mohammed Ahmed bin Abdul Aziz Al Shihhi, Undersecretary, Ministry of Economy; Reem Al Hashimy, Minister of State for International Cooperation and Director General, Expo 2020 Dubai Bureau; Dr Maitha bint Salem Al Shamsi, Minister of State, and many more.

In 2019, in partnership with CNBC Arabiya, Menon launched the ABLF Talks TV series featuring Asian government and business leaders in 3-minute episodes across six leadership themes.

Dubai Cares
IEDEA serves as Strategic Partner to Dubai Cares. Dubai Cares works towards providing children and young people in developing countries with access to quality education through the design and funding of programmes.

World Government Summit
IEDEA serves as Advisor and Outreach Partner to the World Government Summit since 2014. The summit is a knowledge-exchange platform that brings together 150 governments and international organisations.

Dubai Investment Week
IEDEA serves as Advisor and Outreach Partner to the Dubai Investment Week. The Dubai Investment Week is attended by high-level investors, policymakers and entrepreneurs who are looking for growth opportunities and expansion in Dubai.

The National Program for Happiness and Wellbeing
IEDEA serves as Advisor and Outreach Partner for the UAE's National Program for Happiness and Wellbeing. The NPHW aims to establish happiness and wellbeing as a lifestyle in the UAE.

Mohammed bin Rashid Centre for Government Innovation (MBRCGI)
IEDEA serves as Outreach Partner for Mohammed bin Rashid Centre for Government Innovation. The MBRCGI aims to make innovation one of the key pillars of the UAE Government.

In Celebration of Legendary Friendship (ICLF Series)
"India and the UAE: In Celebration of a Legendary Friendship" is a coffee-table book authored by Venu Rajamony, former Indian Consul-General in Dubai. The book traces historical between the two India and the UAE, detailing political ties, business relations and social sector engagements. It features a message from Sheikh Mohammed Bin Rashid Al Maktoum, and a foreword by Sheikh Nahayan Mabarak Al Nahayan, the UAE's Minister for Higher Education and Scientific Research.

‘India and Oman: a Legacy of Goodwill’ is the second edition of ‘The ICLF Series’ and will be launched in 2012.

India-UAE Knowledge Forum
The India-UAE Knowledge Forum is a joint venture by IEDEA and the Rajen Kilachand Knowledge Foundation to establish a forum in which potential areas of cooperation between India and UAE could be discussed. According to Malini N. Menon, "We are particularly interested in creating and nurturing a sustainable forum that explores public-private partnership in Education & HRD in the context of the exciting changes taking in both the UAE and India."

Dr.Prathap C. Reddy, chairman of Apollo Hospitals Group, after receiving the ABLF Lifetime Achievement Award, said,"This forum has truly demonstrated the power of the term - Stronger Together and shows the true spirit of emerging Asia - cohesive, collaborative and most importantly visionary".

Asian Business Awards Middle East (ABA ME)
The Asian Business Awards Middle East 2007 was created by IEDEA, Axis International Group and Real Media (part of the Zee Network). It recognised and rewarded pioneering business personalities that have “blazed new trails and set new benchmarks” in the Middle East business world. The criterion for each nomination category was set by PricewaterhouseCoopers. The event was hosted by Riz Khan and was covered by regional and global networks.

OneAsia2020
On 20 December 2013, Thaksin Shinawatra, Former Prime Minister of Thailand formed the OneAsia2020 initiative, in partnership with the ABLF Series, in the hope of fostering diplomacy in the region and laying the groundwork to solve some of Asia's biggest social and political concerns.
The OneAsia2020 initiative is a call to the Asian region to come together in proactive intent, peace and partnership in a pro‐Asia movement, designed to create a unique circle of empowerment.

“This is indeed the momentum to take the One Asia metamorphosis. Now is the time to build on Asia’s potential to make it the economic powerhouse … that it should be,” Shinawatra said.

Images of Success
The Images of Success Series compiles stories of high-achieving Asian business professionals.

References

External links
 
 
 
 
 

Companies based in Dubai